Johnny Jones may refer to:

Sports

Gridiron football
Johnnie Jones (born 1962), American football running back in the Canadian Football League
Johnny Jones (American football) (born 1988), American football defensive tackle 
Johnny "Lam" Jones (1958–2019), American sprinter and professional football wide receiver

Other sports
Johnny Jones (pitcher) (1892–1980), American baseball player
Johnny Jones (outfielder) (1899–?), American Negro leagues baseball player
Johnny Jones (basketball player) (born 1943), American basketball player
Johnny Jones (basketball coach) (born 1961), American basketball coach
Johnny Jones (boxer), Welsh flyweight boxing champion
Johnny Jones (rugby league), rugby league footballer of the 1930s and 1940s

Others
Johnny Jones (pioneer) (1809–1869), pioneer New Zealand settler
Little Johnny Jones (pianist) (1924–1964), American Chicago blues pianist and singer
Johnny "Yard Dog" Jones (1941–2015), American blues singer, musician and songwriter
Johnnie Jones (lawyer) (1919–2022), American military veteran, civil rights activist, and politician
Johnny J. Jones (1874–1930), American carnival showman

See also

John Jones (disambiguation)
Jonathan Jones (disambiguation)